The knowledge triangle refers to the interaction between research, education and innovation, which are key drivers of a knowledge-based society.  In the European Union, it also refers to an attempt to better link together these key concepts, with research and innovation already highlighted by the development of the Lisbon Strategy and, more recently, lies behind the creation of the European Institute of Technology (EIT).

External links
Website of pilot projets that developed concepts for the organization of the EIT
Frequently Asked Questions : Why does the EU need a European Institute of Technology ?
EIT: a new model for the knowledge triangle

Knowledge